Freedom – Civil Rights Party for More Freedom and Democracy (Die Freiheit – Bürgerrechtspartei für mehr Freiheit und Demokratie), also known as The Freedom, was a political party in Germany which identified as conservative-liberal or classical liberal. The party, described by German mainstream media as right-wing populist, was known for its criticism of Islam.

It was founded in October 2010 by Berlin city parliamentarian René Stadtkewitz who had been expelled from the conservative CDU for inviting the Islamophobic Dutch politician Geert Wilders to Berlin. The party seeks the implementation of a direct citizen democracy based on the Swiss model and extensive changes in immigration and integration policy.

History 
Freedom was founded in October 2010 by René Stadtkewitz in the wake of the immigration debate spurred by the then-member of the Executive Board of the Deutsche Bundesbank Thilo Sarrazin. The Berlin city parliamentarian Stadtkewitz was expelled from the Christian Democratic Union faction in 2010 after inviting Dutch politician Geert Wilders of the Party for Freedom to hold a speech in Berlin. A number of other politicians who left their respective parties joined Stadtkewitz, while prominent Islam and immigration critic Thilo Sarrazin refused participation in the new party, but fought to stay in his Social Democratic Party and stated that the immigration and integration issues had to be discussed inside the major parties. In June 2011, the party expanded, founding state associations in ten German states.

The 2011 Berlin state election was the first election the party participated in. Freedom won 1.0% of the popular vote.

In 2016 the party stated that its objectives had largely been adopted by the Alternative für Deutschland party and was subsequently dissolved by its members.

Ideology

Freedom identifies as a conservative-liberal or classical liberal party. Stadtkewitz himself has explained that his party would be more liberal than the FDP, less statist than the SPD and more anti-political establishment than the German Greens.

Some of their core issues included:

 The introduction of direct citizen democracy based on the Swiss model.
 Tougher measures on crime
 The reduction of immigration to deal with integration issues.
 Support of Israel.
 Stricter social welfare policies.
 Withdrawal from the European Union.
 Combatting the "Islamisation of Germany."

The program of the party was modeled after the one of the Dutch Party for Freedom, founded and led by Geert Wilders.

Some German media have variously described the party as right-wing populist, islamophobic, and conservative.

The party called for critical observation of imams, mosques, and Islamic schools and for a review of Islamic organizations to ensure their compliance with German laws, and condemned efforts to build a parallel legal structure based on sharia.

International cooperation
Freedom received support from Dutch politician Geert Wilders, leader and founder of the Party for Freedom, who announced his intention to include the party in his International Freedom Alliance project. Politician Oskar Freysinger of the Swiss People's Party gave a speech on the occasion of Freedom's founding event in Bavaria. In 2012, the party took part in a "Global Counter Jihad rally" in Stockholm, Sweden along with other groups such as Stop Islamization of Nations (SION), and party leader Michael Stürzenberger was simultaneously leader of the German section of Stop Islamisation of Europe (SIOE).

References

External links

 Freedom official website
 Freedom international website

2010 establishments in Germany
2016 disestablishments in Germany
Anti-Islam political parties in Europe
Classical liberal parties
Conservative liberal parties
National liberal parties
Direct democracy parties
Eurosceptic parties in Germany
Far-right political parties in Germany
Anti-immigration politics in Germany
Geert Wilders
Anti-Islam sentiment in Germany
Political parties established in 2010
Political parties disestablished in 2016
Defunct political parties in Germany
Politics of Berlin
Right-wing populism in Germany
Counter-jihad